Thomas Ludlam Jr. House is located in Dennis Township, Cape May County, New Jersey, United States. The house was built in 1790 and was added to the National Register of Historic Places on November 26, 2004.

See also
National Register of Historic Places listings in Cape May County, New Jersey

References

Dennis Township, New Jersey
Houses on the National Register of Historic Places in New Jersey
Houses completed in 1790
Houses in Cape May County, New Jersey
National Register of Historic Places in Cape May County, New Jersey
New Jersey Register of Historic Places